Kassym-Jomart Kemeluly Tokayev (born 17 May 1953) is a Kazakh politician and diplomat who is currently serving as the President of Kazakhstan since 20 March 2019. Between 20 March and 12 June 2019, he served as acting president after the resignation of Nursultan Nazarbayev, who previously held the presidential post for nearly three decades.

Born in Alma-Ata (now Almaty), Tokayev attended the Moscow State Institute of International Relations where after graduating in 1975, he worked as a diplomat in Singapore and China. After the dissolution of the Soviet Union, Tokayev became the Deputy Foreign Minister of a newly independent Kazakhstan in 1992, where he was involved on the issues of nuclear disarmament within the former Soviet republics. In 1999, Tokayev became the Deputy Prime Minister, and in October of that year with the endorsement of the Parliament, he was appointed as Prime Minister by President Nursultan Nazarbayev. From 2002, Tokayev served as Foreign Minister and State Secretary, where he continued to play an active role in the field of nuclear non-proliferation. He was the Director-General of the UN Office at Geneva from 2011 to 2013 and served twice as a Chairman of the Kazakh Senate from 2007 to 2011 and 2013 to 2019.

In 2019, Tokayev assumed office as the acting president after Nursultan Nazarbayev's resignation. Being a member of the ruling Amanat party, he won a non-democratic snap election in June of that year with the support of Nazarbayev as the nominee for the party. After being fully sworn to office, Tokayev pledged to continue Nazarbayev's policies. During his presidency, he has enacted several reforms including increasing workers' salaries, reducing corruption, abolishing capital punishment, and decentralizing the local government. From 2020, Tokayev had endured the economic downturn and troubles caused by the COVID-19 pandemic and War in Afghanistan and has sought to solve Kazakhstan's rising inflation, domestic terrorism, illegal migration, drug trafficking, nuclear energy development and power shortages caused by cryptocurrency mining, as well as the COVID-19 vaccination rollout. In 2022, Tokayev announced constitutional reforms that would limit his powers and grant more authority to the Parliament. As a result, he initiated a constitutional referendum upon which was backed by an overwhelming number of voters and led to the complete stripping of Nazarbayev's post-presidential privileges regarding policymaking.

Since becoming president, Tokayev's political influence and role in Kazakhstan had steadily grown apart from Nazarbayev as he assumed various other powerful positions which were previously held by Nazarbayev starting with the chairmanship of the Assembly of People in 2021. In January 2022, he imposed nationwide state of emergency, sacked the entirety of Asqar Mamin's government, and ordered for security forces to use deadly force following a two-week long violent unrest that had broken out on early January of that year. Shortly thereafter, Tokayev took leadership role in the Security Council and ruling Amanat party from Nazarbayev and along with his relatives, dismissed several officials who held a close relationship with Nazarbayev.

While managing to maintain the country's stability, ensuring political transition, and enacting new reforms, Tokayev's governance has remained authoritarian with human rights abuses. The 2022 Suisse secrets leaks revealed that the Tokayev family had maintained an elaborate network of secretive offshore wealth assets since at least 1998.

Early life and education 

Kassym-Jomart Tokayev was born to a Muslim Kazakh family in the city of Alma-Ata (now Almaty). His father, Kemel Tokayev (1923–1986), was a World War II veteran and a well-known writer who is considered to be the founder of Kazakh detective fiction. His mother, Turar Shabarbayeva (1931–2000), worked at the Alma-Ata Institute of Foreign Languages. He was named after his uncle Kemel Tokayev, who was also a Red Army soldier and was killed during the Battle of Rzhev. When describing the impact the war had on his father, Tokayev said that he "did not like to talk about the war" and only shared his feelings upon "his first encounter with the enemy, the courage of the average soldier, and his burning desire to return home." Kemel after the war received a medal for his coverage of the development of the Virgin Lands campaign.

From 1970, Tokayev attended the Moscow State Institute of International Relations where he studied Mandarin. In his fifth year, Tokayev was sent to training courses at the Soviet embassy in China for six months.

Early career 
Upon graduation from the Moscow State Institute of International Relations in 1975, Tokayev joined the Soviet Ministry of Foreign Affairs where he was posted to the Soviet Embassy in Singapore.

In 1979, Tokayev returned to the Soviet Ministry of Foreign Affairs. In 1983, he went to China for training courses at the Beijing Language Institute. In 1984–1985, he served in the Ministry of Foreign Affairs. He was then posted to the Soviet embassy in Beijing where he served until 1991 as Second Secretary, First Secretary, and Counsellor. In 1991, he enrolled at the Soviet Diplomatic Academy of the Ministry of Foreign Affairs in Moscow for a training course towards senior diplomats.

Political career

Deputy Foreign Minister (1992–1994) 

In March 1992, Tokayev was appointed as a Deputy Foreign Minister of the Republic of Kazakhstan. From there, he briefly took stance against nuclear disarmament in the former Soviet republics of Belarus and Ukraine under pressure by Russia, letting negotiations to be held under the United Nations Security Council, writing it as “a significant success of Kazakh diplomacy, which was taking its first steps in the international arena, opened the way for further negotiations with all influential states at the highest level."

In 1993, he became First Deputy Foreign Minister and on 13 October 1994, Tokayev was appointed to the post of Minister of Foreign Affairs.

Prime Minister of Kazakhstan (1999–2002)

In March 1999, Tokayev was promoted to the post of Deputy Prime Minister. In October 1999, with the endorsement of the Parliament, he was appointed as a Prime Minister by Decree of the President of the Republic of Kazakhstan. During his tenure, the GDP growth rate grew by 13.5% in 2001 while the inflation rate being reduced by 11.2%.

On 20 November 2001, at the Khabar Agency broadcast, Tokayev threatened to resign from his post as the PM unless President Nursultan Nazarbayev would dismiss several government officials whom he accused of being "intriguers" such as Deputy PM Oraz Jandosov, Labour and Social Protection of the Population Minister Alikhan Baimenov, Pavlodar Regional äkim Galymzhan Zhakiyanov and Deputy Defense Minister Janat Ertlesova by trying to decentralise the country's executive branch and slow down the democratization programs. The move came just days after a group of prominent Kazakh officials whom Tokayev accused and others announced the creation of Democratic Choice of Kazakhstan at a press conference. As a result, six cabinet members, including Jandosov, Zhakiyanov and Ertlesova were dismissed by Nazarbayev.

On 28 January 2002, Tokayev resigned from his post without a full explanation, calling it a "normal event" due to "a strong presidency". He was subsequently appointed as a State Secretary and Minister of Foreign Affairs concurrently.

Foreign Minister and State Secretary (1994–1999, 2002–2007) 

As a Minister of Foreign Affairs, Tokayev played an active role in the field of nuclear non-proliferation. In 1995 and 2005, he participated in the Review Conferences for the Treaty on the Non-Proliferation of Nuclear Weapons (NPT) in New York City. In 1996, he signed the Comprehensive Nuclear-Test-Ban Treaty (CTBT) in New York, and in 2005 the Treaty on a Nuclear-Weapons-Free Zone in Central Asia (CANWFZ) in Semipalatinsk.

He was elected Chairman of the Council of Foreign Ministers of the Commonwealth of Independent States and of the Shanghai Cooperation Organisation. Tokayev took part in ten sessions of the United Nations General Assembly. He held a diplomatic rank of Ambassador Extraordinary and Plenipotentiary.

Chairman of the Senate (2007–2011, 2013–2019) 
As Chair of the Senate of Kazakhstan, Tokayev was elected in 2008 as a vice-president of the Parliamentary Assembly of the Organization for Security and Co-operation in Europe (OSCE). He served the post until being relieved on 15 April 2011 after being appointed as Director-General of the United Nations. President Nursultan Nazarbayev expressed his gratitude towards Tokayev, stating that he's "absolutely committed to the path of reforms that I am pursuing."

On 16 October 2013, he was reappointed again as the Senate Chair and was unanimously confirmed by the Senate MP's.

During the 2016 Protests against land reforms in Kazakhstan, Tokayev stressed the issue of land lease to be dealt with in a critical matter.

After Kazakhstan unveiled its first proposed version of the Latin alphabet in 2017, it received criticism among citizens and linguistics over its use of apostrophes for marking accent letters. Many businesses and organisations began adopting the new Latinised script.

During the interview to BBC News in June 2018, Tokayev hinted a possibility on Nazarbayev's succession by expressing his belief that he wouldn't run for re-election as his presidential term was to end in 2020.

Director-General of the U.N. Office at Geneva 

In March 2011, the Secretary-General of the United Nations announced the appointment of Tokayev as Under Secretary-General, Director-General of the United Nations Office at Geneva and Personal Representative of the United Nations Secretary-General to the Conference on Disarmament. He served as Secretary-General of the Conference on Disarmament. He was also the Designated Official for safety and security of U.N. personnel for Switzerland.

Tokayev holds a Doctorate in political science. He is the author of nine books and numerous articles on international affairs. He is a Fellow of the World Academy of Art and Science, a member of the Panel of Eminent Persons at the Munich Security Conference, an Honorary Professor of Shenzhen University, an Honorary Professor and Doctor of the Diplomatic Academy of the Ministry of Foreign Affairs of the Russian Federation, as well as a member of its board of trustees. He is also Honorary Dean of the Geneva School of Diplomacy and International Relations. As Director-General of UNOG, he received the "Academicus" award from the University of Geneva. According to the Russian Biographic Institution, Tokayev was admitted as a "Person of the year – 2018".

2019 presidential campaign 

On 9 April 2019, Tokayev announced early elections to be held on 9 June 2019. From there, he guaranteed electoral transparency and insisted that Kazakhstan is a democratic state which Tokayev cited as reason for a president to be elected according to the "will of the people" as well as eliminate "political uncertainty".

Tokayev, with the backing of former president Nazarbayev, became a candidate for presidency following his nomination by the ruling Amanat party, then known as Nur Otan on 23 April 2019. During the campaign, Tokayev's election promises focused on continuation of existing policies, justice and progress, citing his personal reason in participating in the race to ensure Nazarbayev's continuity, a major part of Tokayev's platform. While campaigning, Tokayev was mocked on social media for his use of photo manipulation software to erase his wrinkles and double chin from official photos. He was elected president of Kazakhstan on 9 June with 71% of the popular vote. He was congratulated by foreign heads of state such as Xi Jinping, Ilham Aliyev, Recep Tayyip Erdogan, Emomali Rahmon, and Sooronbay Jeenbekov.

Presidency

Inauguration 
On 19 March 2019, then-President Nursultan Nazarbayev announced his resignation. According to the Constitution of Kazakhstan, in case of early termination of powers, the Senate Chairman becomes President until the end of the previous term. On 20 March, Tokayev officially took office as president. Immediately after the inauguration, Tokayev proposed renaming the capital city of Kazakhstan after his predecessor, and the same day the Parliament of Kazakhstan approved the renaming of Astana to Nur-Sultan. Russian President Vladimir Putin was one of the first foreign leaders to congratulate Tokayev, inviting him to visit Moscow in a joint telephone conversation with him and Nazarbayev. The Chinese government also described Tokayev as an "old friend" and "good friend".

Following his victory in the 2019 presidential election, Tokayev was fully sworn as Kazakhstan's second president on 12 June 2019 at the Palace of Independence in Nur-Sultan, which was attended by high-ranking Kazakh officials including former president Nazarbayev himself. From there, Tokayev addressed the nation that he would serve the nation's citizens fairly, embarking that "different opinions, united nation" would be a slogan of his presidency.

Term

2019 
In June 2019, following a military ammo deposit blast in the town of Arys which resulted in evacuations of residents and hundreds of injuries, Tokayev launched a criminal case and ordered the Interior and Defence ministries to prevent possible more explosions, pledging that any perpetrators would be prosecuted. Tokayev paid visit to the town on 25 June, touring buildings that were affected by the blast as well as meeting with hospitalised victims.

Tokayev delivered his first State of the Nation Address on 2 September 2019. The address focused on strengthening civil society and social security, supporting domestic business and economic development.

In October 2019, it was announced that all potential ministerial candidates needed the approval of Nazarbayev before being appointed, with the exception of Minister of Defence, Interior Minister and Foreign Minister.

After the Bek Air Flight 2100 crash, Tokayev declared the following day, 28 December 2019, a national day of mourning and said that "all those responsible will be severely punished in accordance with the law." He also ordered the suspension of the flight authorisation of Bek Air, the domestic airline involved.

2020 
Following the Dungan–Kazakh ethnic clashes which broke out in February 2020, Tokayev fired the governor, deputy governor and police chief of the southern Jambyl Region. Tokayev blamed "two criminal groups" fighting over contraband for the deadly ethnic violence between ethnic Kazakhs and the relatively wealthier Dungan minority.

In an interview to Informburo news agency, Tokayev commented on the fate of Mukhtar Dzhakishev, saying "this issue is exclusively within the competence of the court. Of course, I am aware that Dzhakishev has repeatedly applied for parole on ill-health. The session of the court of first instance will be held on 3 March. Let's wait for its decision, which I am sure will be fair." On 3 March 2020, the Semey City Court upheld the motion to grant parole to Dzhakishev. He served a 14-year prison sentence since 2009.

On 2 May 2020, Nazarbayev's daughter Dariga Nazarbayeva was removed from the Senate and her role as the chair by Tokayev. Many theories arose that this was a sign of either Tokayev was expanding his political influence or a growing feud between the ruling elite.

In his second State of the Nation Address on 1 September 2020, Tokayev unveiled seven reforms with most focus on economic recovery. From there, he spoke of optimizing Kazakhstan's social system, increasing productivity and a greener economy, leveling business conditions, investing more in education and overseeing the state's administration as it becomes more sensitive and accountable.

2021 
In autumn 2020, Tokayev announced date for 2021 legislative elections, where he asserted that the electoral and political process had been liberalised to allow for greater involvement in civil society and that the newly incoming parliament convocation will focus on support for socio-economic reforms. During election day, Tokayev said that the government would resign in accordance with law and that he would consult with newly elected MPs and party leaders in regard to the appointments of Prime Minister and cabinet members. In the aftermath of vote, the ruling Nur Otan despite losing dozen seats, topped the results in which the Organization for Security and Co-operation in Europe (OSCE) citied that the elections "lacked genuine competition". At the opening session of the 7th Parliament held on 15 January 2021, Tokayev reappointed Asqar Mamin as the Prime Minister.

On 28 April 2021, former president Nazarbayev resigned from the post as the chairman of the Assembly of People of Kazakhstan (QHA). From there, he proposed Tokayev to succeed him which was supported by the QHA members. Tokayev, in turn, suggested Nazarbayev to be named as the "Honorary Chairman", saying that the status should "rightfully belong" to him due to a "historical merit."

On 23 November 2021, Kazakhstan's First President Nursultan Nazarbayev's spokesperson, Aidos Ukibay, announced that the former president will hand over the powers of the Nur Otan party chair to current President Kassym-Jomart Tokayev.

2022 

Following the 2022 Kazakh unrest, Tokayev dismissed Prime Minister Asqar Mamin as well as his cabinet. While initially attempting to calm the public in early stages of the protests by promising to unveil his new proposed reforms and introduced price controls for liquefied natural gas, diesel and gasoline, as well as for socially significant goods, Tokayev issued orders for the army to use lethal force against protesters, and to "shoot to kill, without warning." He also appointed Alihan Smaiylov, who served as Deputy Prime Minister and Finance Minister prior, as the new PM.

On 16 March 2022, Tokayev proposed constitutional reforms to limit the powers of his office, saying the country needed to switch from "superpresidential" rule to a presidential republic with a strong parliament.

Early elections of the President of the Republic of Kazakhstan were held on November 20, 2022, in which Kassym-Jomart Tokayev won with 81.31% of the votes.

Domestic actions
After assuming office, Tokayev outlined main directions for Kazakhstan which were increasing the incomes of population, eradication of corruption, judicial reforms, creating new jobs with decent wages, solving housing issues, fair social policies, regional developments, spiritualism, foreign national interests and youth opportunities. In his first month of presidency, Tokayev made several reorganisations and appointments within the administration and the ministerial cabinet with some top officials such as Presidential Administration head Bakhytzhan Sagintayev and National Security Committee chairman Karim Massimov keeping their posts while others being reshuffled or forced to stepped down.

Political reforms

In May 2020, Tokayev signed the laws “On the procedure for organizing and holding peaceful assemblies in the Republic of Kazakhstan”, “On introducing amendments to the Constitutional Law of the Republic of Kazakhstan“, “On Elections in the Republic of Kazakhstan”, and “On introducing amendments and additions to the Law of the Republic of Kazakhstan “On Political Parties”. The new laws are an important part of the measures to strengthen the state's democratic foundations, and enhance the role of civil society. In his State of the Nation Address, he emphasised that "Kazakhstan must create a multi-party system to build a modern, effective state", also saying that the ruling Nur Otan party should collaborate more with other parties.

Tokayev advocated political reforms that would promote the concept of a "state that listens" to civil society creating a constructive dialogue. Tokayev initiated the establishment of the new National Council of Public Trust to facilitate this dialogue. He also called for direct elections for the äkıms (local heads) of rural districts, townships, and villages to be held in 2021 to which he signed decree on 14 September 2020 of the implementation of National Plan of Measures which set tasks for the drafting of constitutional amendments that would allow for rural äkım direct elections as well as the development of local government and its functions. After the 2021 legislative elections which saw three of five contesting parties retain their seats in the Mazhilis, Tokayev at the opening first session of the 7th Parliament proposed to reduce the electoral threshold from 7% to 5%, stating it would encourage more registered parties to participate in the future parliamentary elections as well as the vote option "Against all" to be re-included in the ballots once again. As the Parliament ratified Tokayev's proposed constitutional amendments, he signed the laws into place on 25 May 2021.

Capital punishment 

In December 2019, Tokayev announced that Kazakhstan would join the Second Optional Protocol to the International Covenant on Civil and Political Rights, after the issue was raised by Kazakh human rights activists and experts during discussions at the meetings of the National Council of Public Trust. From there, Tokayev set the task for the Ministry of Foreign Affairs to start the process of joining the Second Optional Protocol which would set measures in abolishing of death penalty in the country.

At the Seventy-fifth session of the United Nations General Assembly, Tokayev spoke to the Assembly, saying that his decision was driven "to fulfill a fundamental right to life and human dignity." Kazakh Representative to the UN Kairat Umarov signed the protocol on 23 September 2020. On 2 January 2021, Tokayev signed decree approved by the Parliament in abolishing death penalty in Kazakhstan.

Economic reforms and policies 

During Tokayev's first months in office, in an attempt to reduce burden on socially vulnerable segments for the population; government bailouts for banks were put to an end and a system of loan forgiveness was implemented. In 2020, the salaries for teachers, doctors and social workers were increased.

In amidst of the worsening economic situation worldwide as a result of COVID-19 pandemic, Tokayev instructed the government to form an anti-crisis plan which would fulfill "all social obligations". A series of packages were unveiled in response, which aimed at easing burden for private sector by providing cheaper credit, tax incentives, cutting back on audits and promoting employment. As the pandemic progressed, inflation for goods began to grow leading to an increase in social and labour discontent particularly in western Kazakhstan. Tokayev, in response, blamed the government and the central bank for being too "powerless" and from there, urged them to reduce the inflation rate, noting the surplus amount of the money supply that exists in the state budget.

In September 2021, Tokayev called for an increase of the national minimum wage for the first time since 2018, citing the global pandemic that affected the purchasing power for citizens and asserted that it would lead to growth in domestic consumption. In terms of wage fund, Tokayev instructed the government to implement soft measures in encouraging businesses to raise salaries for employees by pledging for state-supported benefits.

COVID-19 response 

Due to the outbreak of the COVID-19 in Kazakhstan in March 2020, Tokayev enacted a state of emergency in the country on 15 March. During his national televised address, Tokayev stressed that he had signed a special decree on measures to ensure the stability of the state functioning, citing that the documents allow an increase the efficiency of state bodies, strengthen the vertical of power and make all necessary decisions promptly in a manual mode. In an attempt to curb the spread of the virus, Tokayev ordered the cancellations of both the Nowruz celebrations as well as the Victory Day military parade in honour of the 75th anniversary of the end of World War II in Europe. During the period, the nationwide lockdowns were prolonged twice before being lifted in May 2020. Just a month later in July 2020, Tokayev reintroduced restrictions in Kazakhstan which lasted until August 2020. In autumn 2020, Tokayev assessed that the lockdowns would be avoided depending on the levels of public mask and social distancing compliance.

As a proponent of COVID-19 vaccination, Tokayev blamed Healthcare Ministry and the entire government as during a slow jab pace in the early months of the vaccine administering. In an effort to boost public confidence, Tokayev received his dose of a Kazakh-manufactured Sputnik V COVID-19 vaccine in April 2021, to which according to a spokesperson that Tokayev felt no side effects in result. Tokayev also vowed to crackdown on fraudulent vaccine passports and provide Kazakh citizens broader options for different vaccine manufacturers.

Education 

At the teacher's conference held in August 2019, Tokayev announced that the average salary for schoolteachers in Kazakhstan would be increased by double within four years. He also instructed the Ministry of Education and Science to develop and launch special programs to overcome the academic gap of children from low-income families and schools in socially troubled areas, noting the need of overcome educational inequality specially between rural and urban areas.

Energy and cryptocurrency 

Tokayev expressed the need for Kazakhstan to have a nuclear power plant in April 2019, claiming that the country would face an electricity deficit by 2030. From early 2021, energy consumption in Kazakhstan sharply rose by 8% as a result of increase in cryptocurrency mining from farmers fleeing China.

In May 2021, Tokayev announced the Low-Carbon Development Concept, a national project which seeks to reduce Kazakhstan's dependency on coal by development electric power industry and the country's energy balance by 2035.

Environment 

In his inaugural speech, Tokayev called environmental issues "concerning" and proposed a unified policy by adopting a new code which would protect the environment. On 17 June 2019, he signed a decree forming the Ministry of Ecology, Geology and Natural Resources, appointing Magzum Myrzagaliev to the post. The Ministry was given the authority to protect the environment, oversee the rational use of natural resources, geology and reproduction of the mineral and raw materials base, as well as the treatment of solid household waste, water and wastewater, and forestry.

Tokayev addressed the problems regarding the air pollution in Almaty. He instructed the government, city äkımat, and Samruk-Energy to implement final decision in the transformation of the Almaty-2 thermal power station to natural gas in order to limit harmful emissions that come from the plant which is estimated to be 30% of all other sources, warning that any delay would be "absolutely unacceptable."

On 4 October 2021, Tokayev signed a bill aimed at protecting the ecosystem of the Caspian Sea by establishing a regular assessment for the state of marine environment and coastal areas of the sea, and an assessment to the level of sea pollution along the coastline.

Healthcare 

Tokayev supported a health insurance mandate in Kazakhstan as a way to improve the quality and accessibility of medical services as well as maintained funding for free medical care and the development of healthcare system.

On 7 July 2020, Tokayev signed the new code "On public health and healthcare system" and law "On amendments and additions to certain legislative acts on healthcare issues" into place, which strengthened legal protection for medical personnel, introduced a differentiated approach to medical errors, and redefined a citizen's rights regarding vaccination. The code also restricted the consumption of e-cigarettes and introduced a ban on the import, production and distribution of snus and other non-smoking tobacco products, as well as introduced administrative responsibility for the sale of tobacco products to persons under the age of 21.

Infrastructure 
Tokayev pledged for the government to continue in investing for the development of infrastructure so that Kazakh citizens would have an access for clean drinking water, natural gas and public transport and continue in monitoring the implementation of the Nurly Zhol programme, of which was enacted by Nazarbayev. He called for the officials along with the Parliament and Accounts Committee to ensure the efficient use of budget funds.

During a visit to Almaty in May 2020, Tokayev was presented with plans for the reconstruction of the Almaty International Airport which included a new terminal, from there he expressed his desire that the Almaty Airport would become largest aviation hub in Central Asia.

Foreign policy

Tokayev pledged continuity of foreign policy initiated by his predecessor Nursultan Nazarbayev. This means the continuation of measures to attract foreign investments, multi-vector foreign policy and ensuring security in the region. During his first month in office, he had met 4 world leaders, 2 of them abroad and the other two in Nur-Sultan.

In April 2021, Tokayev signed decree forming the Special Representative for International Cooperation, claiming that such post would increase attention of Kazakhstan's leadership to international cooperation concerns in the light of the dynamically changing global and regional agenda. He appointed Erzhan Kazykhanov to the post, whom was instructed to deal with issues of expanding international cooperation in the humanitarian sphere, climate diplomacy, as well as promoting Kazakhstan's key foreign policy initiatives.

During the sixth meeting of the Conference on Interaction and Confidence-Building Measures in Asia held on 10–11 October 2021, Tokayev proposed turning the intergovernmental forum into a full-fledged organisation, outlining that the transformation would emphasise Asia's new role in global affairs which in turn give the member states commitment to create "a truly common, indivisible, and comprehensive security architecture on the largest continent".

Afghanistan 

Following the 2021 Taliban offensive, Tokayev urged to take measures in ensuring safety of Kazakhstani citizens and diplomats within Afghanistan, in which Kazakhstan would closely follow its developments. During a meeting with the EU Special Representative for Central Asia Tehri Hakala, Tokayev expressed concern in regards to the stability in Afghanistan, warning that entire region of Central Asian is facing a risk due to the conflict. On 18 August 2021, he instructed the Ministry of Foreign Affairs to attempt to provide a maximum assistance in returning ethnic Kazakhs residing in Afghanistan, while noting that the issue of accepting Afghan refugees would not be considered.

Russia 

According to political analyst Rico Isaacs, the decision in Tokayev replacing Nursultan Nazarbayev was due to his own full will to not rapidly implement democratic reforms, which would hurt Nazarbayev's legacy of stability and relations with Russia. Just two weeks after taking office, Tokayev visited Moscow in his first foreign state visit on 4 April 2019, meeting with Putin alongside other Russian officials. During the visit, Putin offered Russian assistance to Tokayev in the construction of a proposed nuclear power plant in the country. In June 2019, Tokayev stated that the decision of constructing a nuclear power plants would be made on decision by local matter, if by means of a referendum.

In late 2020, Russian lawmakers Vyacheslav Nikonov and Yevgeny Fyodorov made remarks on how the entire Kazakhstani territory was a gift given by the Soviet Union and that was currently being leased by Russia. This sparked backlash from the Kazakh Ministry of Foreign Affairs which warned about severing relations between both nations due to "provocative attacks". In response to controversial statements, Tokayev in response on Egemen Qazaqstan, wrote that such words from "some foreign citizens" are aimed at "spoiling" relations between two states, insisting that "nobody from outside gave Kazakhs this large territory as a gift."

After Russia invaded its neighboring Ukraine, Tokayev and Kazakh Foreign Minister Mukhtar Tleuberdi refused to recognize the Russian puppet states of Donetsk People's Republic and Luhansk People's Republic. He said that "we recognize neither Taiwan, nor Kosovo, nor South Ossetia and Abkhazia. In all likelihood, this principle will be applied to quasi-state entities, which, in our opinion, are Luhansk and Donetsk." As a result, he refused to accept the Order of Alexander Nevsky from Putin.

Tokayev also emphasized that Kazakhstan would comply with Western sanctions imposed on Russia after its invasion of Ukraine, and that the country "will abide by the restrictions imposed on Russia and Belarus." In September 2022, Kazakhstan closed a loophole through which Russian and Belarusian trucks were able to import goods from the European Union into the country without the necessary paperwork.

Following Tokayev’s electoral victory in November 2022, international observers expect him to maintain Kazakhstan's pivot towards the EU and China, and away from Russia.

China 

Tokayev paid a two-day state visit to China in September 2019. There, he met with President Xi Jinping in Beijing of which both leaders agreed to form a permanent comprehensive strategic partnership. Tokayev vowed to triple wheat exports to China to 2 million tonnes possibly including salt, dairy products, meat and poultry as well. During a visit to the Peking University, he met with his long-term intern language teacher Liu Shiqing as well as Kazakhstani students. Shiqing described Tokayev as "sociable, active, quick" who became fluent in Chinese and as "one of the best students."

Former Soviet republics 

On 14 April 2019, Tokayev visited neighboring Uzbekistan for talks with President Shavkat Mirziyoyev. On 16–17 May, Tokayev hosted foreign leaders such as Armen Sarkissian and Mamuka Bakhtadze in the capital for the 12th annual Astana Economic Forum, the first to be hosted by its pioneer, President Nazarbayev. He also hosted the regional leaders of Russia, Kyrgyzstan, Belarus, Tajikistan, Armenia and Moldova for the Eurasian Economic Union and Supreme Eurasian Economic Council summit on 29 May.

During a visit to Kyrgyzstan in late 2019, he visited the House-Museum of Kyrgyz writer Chingiz Aitmatov in Bishkek, where he met with the late writer's wife and reminisced about his first encounters with Aitmatov in Beijing in 1989.

Following the breakout of the 2020 Nagorno-Karabakh war, Tokayev called on Armenia to withdraw from the disputed territory, citing the United Nations Security Council accordance to which he claimed that the Armenian government failed to fulfill for its past 30 years.

Europe 

As a Foreign Minister, Tokayev visited Berlin, Germany on 3–4 October 2006, where he addressed the European Parliament's Foreign Affairs Committee on 3 October in an attempt to gain support amongst members of the Organization for Security and Cooperation in Europe for Kazakhstan's bid to lead the organisation in 2009. In his address he discussed the "fierce" competition between the European Union, China, and India to secure energy sources, saying that Kazakhstan is "one of the very few countries capable of boosting its oil production and thus becoming an important alternative energy supplier to global and European markets." He expressed interest in the Burgas-Alexandroupoli and Odessa-Brody-Gdansk pipeline projects, asking the EU for $80 billion in investment from 2006 to 2021. Tokayev criticised Lithuania for opposing a Russian offer for its Mažeikių oil refinery. He also reaffirmed Kazakhstan's desire to join the European Neighbourhood Policy. Tokayev also rejected the proposed construction of the Trans-Caspian Gas Pipeline to Azerbaijan, in which the EU officials desired due to the likelihood of opposition from other nations bordering the Caspian Sea. Gernot Erler, an official in the German Federal Foreign Office, announced his support for Kazakhstan leading the Organization for Security and Co-operation in Europe (OSCE) for 2009. Portuguese Socialist MP Ana Gomes said to Tokayev, "Minister, you're bidding for the presidency of the OSCE. Yet, the OSCE gave a report on your last elections, on the observation of the elections, which said they failed to meet international standards for genuine elections in many important points. And we hear about political dissent being crushed, we hear even about religious groups being crushed." Tokayev replied that political opposition forces in Kazakhstan "cannot challenge the government" because of their own weaknesses, and that Kazakhstanis need to be "educated" about democracy because the concept is foreign, and the government considers religious tolerance a priority. He criticized the OSCE's election report for "technical irregularities" and biased targeting while calling for more of a "mutual understanding." He further stated that his government believes it would "contribute a lot as a representative, as a country which is located in Central Asia. The geographical dimension of the OSCE has changed [since Kazakhstan joined], this is a unique Eurasian, as well as Pan-American organization. So, the leadership, the presidency of this organization also must reflect this unique character, [this] unique dimension of the organization." He cited efforts to reform Kazakhstan's election process that included a "special program" to modernize the system and establishing "party dominance" in the Parliament so that "parties [that] win the parliamentary elections, obtain [a] majority in the parliament" and "will be able to establish their own governments." He called creating a multi-party system in Kazakhstan a "huge step forward in the process of democratization."

On 4 December 2019, on the eve of a state visit to Germany, he gave an interview to Deutsche Welle, in which he called Germany a "key European partner for Kazakhstan". In that same interview, he drew controversy by saying that he did not believe that the Annexation of Crimea by the Russian Federation was an invasion while also saying that he believed in the "wisdom of the Russian leadership", drawing condemnation from the Ukrainian Ministry of Foreign Affairs, who issued a demarche in response.

United States 

Tokayev met with United States Secretary of State Condoleezza Rice and Barry Lowenkron, the U.S. Assistant Secretary of State for Human Rights, on 25 September 2006 in Rice's suite at the Waldorf-Astoria hotel. According to Anne Gearan, a diplomatic writer for the Associated Press, the U.S. wanted to improve its relations with Kazakhstan despite, according to some analysts, a worsening state of political oppression. Kazakh oil output was expected to significantly increase, along with other Central Asian countries whom were "more authoritarian, too unstable, too poor, or a combination of all three." Prior to her meeting with Tokayev, when Rice was asked whether human rights or energy "would top the agenda" for the meeting with Tokayev, she refused to answer. The United States State Department released a statement saying the diplomats discussed Kazakhstan's cooperation in Afghanistan and Iraq and expressed hope for "a multidimensional relationship with Kazakhstan, which includes U.S. encouragement for continuing reforms."

After becoming president, Tokayev maintained strong relations with Kazakhstan's strategic allies, including the United States. On 2 February 2020, he met with U.S. Secretary of State Mike Pompeo during his visit to Nur-Sultan where both sides expressed the importance of deepening bilateral ties across the entire spectrum of cooperation, including trade, investment, IT technologies, promoting democratic values and combating international terrorism. Pompeo wished for Tokayev in his success in implementing political reforms with an open skies agreement being signed which created a legal basis for launching direct regular flights between Kazakhstan and U.S. According to some analysists, Pompeo's visit to Kazakhstan was seen as an attempt to counter China's influence within the country as he had met with ethnic Kazakh families of whom were victims of the Xinjiang internment camps and urged for Tokayev to pressure China over its persecution of ethnic Uyghur and Kazakhs.

In June 2020, U.S. President Donald Trump congratulated President Tokayev on his one-year anniversary of presidency. In his congratulatory letter, Trump expressed his support for the reforms that had been undertaken in Kazakhstan, and reaffirmed his intention to further develop strategic partnership between the two countries.

Political positions 
Tokayev is described as a "moderate conservative" with years of political experience domestically and internationally. Nevertheless, in an interview with The Wall Street Journal, Tokayev referred himself as a "reformer", stressing that without political reforms, there wouldn't be progress in economic reforms.

According to The Diplomat, Tokayev's political capital was seen to not extend beyond the support by Nazarbayev, which enabled him to garner support and trust from business elites, civil servants, and political institutions. Because of that, Tokayev has been described as "Nazarbayev's political birthchild", while his opponents and critics referred him as "furniture" (Russian: мебель, mebel), a ridicule term first coined by exiled Kazakh businessman Mukhtar Ablyazov in 2019.

Authoritarianism 
Tokayev expressed his point of view on the political system of Kazakhstan in which he favoured a "strong President, authoritative Parliament, accountable Government."

In 2005, at the business conference of the Asian Society held in Almaty, Tokayev clashed with George Soros after his remarks about Kazakhstan sliding towards authoritarianism, calling it "unreasonable to demand from a country that recently celebrated its 13th anniversary to achieve the democratic values inherent in states with centuries-old traditions of building a free society."

Climate change 

Tokayev expressed support for the tackling of climate change, calling it "urgent and existential." At the Climate Ambitions Summit in which was held remotely on 12 December 2020, Tokayev pledged for Kazakhstan to reach carbon neutrality by 2060 with a development and adoption of a long-term development strategy to lower emissions and de-carbonisation of the economy. He said that Kazakhstan is "highly vulnerable to climate change as a landlocked and developing state" with a heavy reliant on fossil fuels and proposed for the planting for two billion trees within the country in order increase carbon absorption and curb looming desertification problems.

Corruption 

Tokayev described his vision regarding corruption, calling it a "direct damage to national security" and advocated for the need of accountability for implementation of state programs and the use of budget funds by äkıms. On 28 November 2019, he signed the "On Amendments and Additions to Certain Legislative Acts of the Republic of Kazakhstan on Civil Service and Anti-Corruption Issues" law into place, which obliged government ministers and äkıms to resign if the top officials within institutions are found guilty of corruption.

Islam 
In the aftermath of the 2016 Orlando nightclub shooting event, Tokayev proclaimed the incident as a "signature dish", calling it "another manifestation of Islamic radicalism."

At the Forum of Muslim Scientists of Eurasia which was held in Astana in March 2018, Tokayev addressed the audience the need for the country to have "enlightened Islam" by strengthening science and cultural traditions in the Islamic civilization.

Russian language 
As president, Tokayev encouraged the Kazakhstani public to learn Kazakh, calling it a "duty of every citizen of Kazakhstan". At the same time, he believed that strengthening the role of the Kazakh language shouldn't infringe on the Russian language, warning that improper handling of the issue would lead to "irreparable consequences" in which he compared to Ukraine that faced interethnic conflicts.

During the 2021 State of the Nation Address, Tokayev noted that Russian is an official language within Kazakhstan, adding that its use can't be hindered in accordance to the law and from there, he obliged to punish to any person taking part in discriminating on the basis of "linguistic and national grounds", a move that was viewed to have occurred in result of a backlash by Russian officials after a viral incident on YouTube showing Kostanay native Quat Ahmetov visiting places and forcing employees to speak Kazakh which led to a series of criminal cases by security agencies and Ahmetov fleeing the country.

Nationalism 
In a written article for The Astana Times, Tokayev warned nationalism becoming "a resurgent and dominant global phenomenon", upon which he cited Donald Trump's victory in the 2016 United States presidential election, suggesting it would result in strong impact on world politics, as well as on domestic situation in many nations including European nations.

Tokayev expressed a negative attitude towards nationalism which he claimed to have gained traction in midst of COVID-19 pandemic, criticising the ideology for provoking conflict between nations that would result in economic losses for Kazakhstan.

Awards and achievements

Kazakh
 Order of the Golden Eagle (2019)
 Order of Otan (2014)
 Order of Nazarbayev (2004)
 Order of Parasat (1996)
 
 Medal "25 years of independence of the Republic of Kazakhstan"
 Medal "10 years of Independence of the Republic of Kazakhstan"
 Medal "10 years to the Parliament of the Republic of Kazakhstan"
 Medal "10 years of Astana" (2018)

Foreign
 Order of Honour (Russia, 2017)
 Order of Friendship (Russia, 2004)
 Order of Prince Yaroslav the Wise, III Degree (Ukraine, 2008)
 Commonwealth Order (Commonwealth of Independent States, 2007)
 Order of the Serbian Flag, 1st Class (2016) 
 Jubilee Medal "20 Years of the Federation Council"
 Tree of Friendship Medal (CIS, 2003)
 CIS Diploma
 Bitaraplyk Order (Turkmenistan, 2021)

Titles and Honors
 Full member of the World Academy of Humanities and Natural Sciences, member of the "Council of Wise Men" of the Munich Security Conference.
 Honorary Professor of Shenzhen University.
 Honorary Professor and Honorary Doctor of the Diplomatic Academy of the Ministry of Foreign Affairs of the Russian Federation, as well as a member of its board of trustees.
 Honorary President of the Kazakhstan Council on International Relations.
 Diploma of the "Academicus" of the University of Geneva.
 S. N. Roerich Memorial Medal.
 According to the Russian Biographical Society, he entered the list of laureates of the "Person of the Year — 2018".
 Ranked among The 500 Most Influential Muslims in the annual edition of The Muslim 500.

Personal life 

Now divorced, Tokayev was married to Nadezhda Tokayeva, with whom he had one son. His son Timur (born in 1984) is an oil entrepreneur who currently resides in Geneva, Switzerland. His brother-in-law Temirtai Izbastin (married to Tokayev's sister Karlyga Izbastina) is currently Kazakhstan's Ambassador to Bulgaria. Tokayev is a polyglot, fluent in Kazakh, Russian, English, Chinese and French.

He was President of the Table Tennis Federation of Kazakhstan for 13 years.

He has made it a point not to mark his birthday with celebrations, with his press secretary saying in 2020 that he "does not like to celebrate this day because his family has never celebrated the birthdays of either the children or parents".

See also
 Government of Kazakhstan
 Parliament of Kazakhstan
 Politics of Kazakhstan
 Tokayev Cabinet

References

External links

|-

|-

|-

|-

|-

1953 births
Living people
Nur Otan politicians
People from Astana
Prime Ministers of Kazakhstan
Chairmen of the Senate of Kazakhstan
Presidents of Kazakhstan
Government ministers of Kazakhstan
Foreign ministers of Kazakhstan
Kazakhstani Muslims
Recipients of the Order of Prince Yaroslav the Wise, 3rd class
Recipients of the Order of Honour (Russia)
Recipients of the Order of Parasat
Deputy Prime Ministers of Kazakhstan